Robert H. "Bob" Johns (October 30, 1942 - October 26, 2020) was an American meteorologist specializing in severe convective storms and tornadoes.

Johns spent his career in forecasting and forecaster training. When he retired, he started working on a project reanalyzing the Tri-State Tornado. He furthered forecasting techniques and developed the modern conceptualization of the derecho following landmark work on "northwest flow" severe weather patterns. Johns also issued the first enhanced wording "Particularly Dangerous Situation" (PDS) for tornado watches during the April 2-3, 1982 tornado outbreak. Johns died on October 26, 2020.

References

External links 
 Listing of formal publications (Storm Prediction Center)

American meteorologists
National Weather Service people
University of Oklahoma alumni
1942 births
2020 deaths
People from Lebanon, Indiana